Heinz Klevenow Jr. (28 August 1940 – 4 March 2021) was a German actor and theatre director.

Biography
Klevenow was born in Prague, the son of actors Marga Legal and Heinz Klevenow. After his studies at the Ernst Busch Academy of Dramatic Arts, he joined the Landestheater Halle. He served as artistic director of the Puppentheater Halle (Halle puppet theatre) from 1978 to 1982 and then at the  theatre from 1989 to 2004. His daughter, Sophie, is a film director.

Heinz Klevenow died on 4 March 2021 at the age of 80.

Filmography
Entlassen auf Bewährung (1965)
Chingachgook, die große Schlange (1967)
Zwei in einer kleinen Stadt (1969)
Der Mörder sitzt im Wembley-Stadion (1970)
 (1977)
 (1978)
 (1981)

References

External links

 
 

1940 births
2021 deaths
German male film actors
German theatre directors
20th-century German male actors
Male actors from Prague
Ernst Busch Academy of Dramatic Arts alumni